Young Beauties and Fools is the second album by Canadian rock band the Glorious Sons. Released on October 13, 2017, Young Beauties and Fools contains the singles "S.O.S. (Sawed Off Shotgun)", "Everything Is Alright" and "Josie". "Everything Is Alright" peaked at #1 on the Canadian Alternative rock radio charts, and saw airplay internationally including being championed by DJ Daniel P. Carter on BBC Radio 1 in the UK. "Everything Is Alright" was named the #3 song of 2017 by Edge 102.1 and the #28 song of 2017 by Indie 88.

The album was written in under two weeks. Music Existence called it "a tightly produced, unapologetically fun record" which "provides a genuine, unpretentious look into the emotional volatility of youth." The Soundboard Reviews called Young Beauties and Fools "an album that’s perfectly listenable and, for the most part, likable, but would be an absolute nightmare to dissect in depth, simply because there’s so little there." The Spill Magazine praised the album as "relatable and catchy", "an easy listen with a whole lot of heart."

At the Juno Awards of 2018, Young Beauties and Fools won the Juno Award for Rock Album of the Year.

Track listing

Personnel 
The Glorious Sons
 Brett Emmons – lead vocals
 Jay Emmons – guitar
 Chris Koster – guitar
 Chris Huot – bass
 Adam Paquette – drums

Charts

References 

2017 albums
The Glorious Sons albums
Albums recorded at Noble Street Studios